Mikiola is a genus of flies belonging to the family Cecidomyiidae.

The species of this genus are found in Europe.

Species
Species:

Mikiola bassiaflorae 
Mikiola bicornis 
Mikiola cristata 
Mikiola fagi 
Mikiola orientalis 
Mikiola populi 
Mikiola populicola

References

Cecidomyiidae